Ernest Devon Manning (October 9, 1890 – April 28, 1973) was a Major League Baseball pitcher, right fielder, and third baseman.

External links
Baseball Reference.com

1890 births
1973 deaths
People from Florala, Alabama
St. Louis Browns players
Major League Baseball pitchers
Major League Baseball third basemen
Major League Baseball right fielders
Baseball players from Alabama
Montgomery Rebels players
Rochester Hustlers players
Atlanta Crackers players
Little Rock Travelers players